Rush was a Canadian rock band that primarily comprised Geddy Lee (bass, vocals), Alex Lifeson (guitar), and Neil Peart (drums, percussion, lyricist). The band formed in Toronto in 1968 with Lifeson, drummer John Rutsey, and bass guitarist/vocalist Jeff Jones, whom Lee immediately replaced. After Lee joined, the band went through several line-ups before arriving at its classic power trio line-up with the addition of Peart in July 1974, who replaced Rutsey four months after the release of their self-titled debut album; this line-up remained intact for the remainder of the band's career.

Rush achieved commercial success in the 1970s with Fly by Night (1975), 2112 (1976), A Farewell to Kings (1977) and Hemispheres (1978). The band's popularity continued throughout the 1980s and 1990s, with albums charting highly in Canada, the US and the UK, including Permanent Waves (1980), Moving Pictures (1981), Signals (1982), Grace Under Pressure (1984) and Counterparts (1993). Rush continued to record and perform until 1997, after which the band entered a four-year hiatus due to personal tragedies in Peart's life. The trio regrouped in 2001 and released three more studio albums: Vapor Trails (2002), Snakes & Arrows (2007), and Clockwork Angels (2012). Rush ceased touring at the end of 2015, and Lifeson announced in January 2018 that the band would not continue, which was cemented by Peart's death from glioblastoma, a type of brain cancer, on January 7, 2020, at the age of 67.

Rush were known for their musicianship, complex compositions and eclectic lyrical motifs drawing heavily on science fiction, fantasy and philosophy. The band's style changed over the years, from a blues-inspired hard rock beginning, later moving into progressive rock, then a period in the 1980s marked by heavy use of synthesizers, before returning to guitar-driven hard rock at the end of the 1980s. Their final work from 2012, marked a return to progressive rock. The members of Rush have been acknowledged as some of the most proficient players on their respective instruments, with each winning numerous awards in magazine readers' polls over the years.

As of 2022, Rush ranks 84th in the U.S. with sales of 26 million albums and industry sources estimate their total worldwide album sales at over 42 million. Rush has been awarded 14 platinum and 3 multi-platinum albums in the US plus 17 platinum albums in Canada. Rush was nominated for seven Grammy Awards, won several Juno Awards, and won an International Achievement Award at the 2009 SOCAN Awards. The band was inducted into the Canadian Music Hall of Fame in 1994 and the Rock and Roll Hall of Fame in 2013.

History

1968–1974: Early years and debut album

The band was formed in the neighbourhood of Willowdale in Toronto, Ontario, by guitarist Alex Lifeson, bassist and frontman Jeff Jones, and drummer John Rutsey, in August 1968. Lifeson and Rutsey had been friends since a young age and played together in a short-lived band, The Projection (formerly known as The Lost Cause). Afterward the two stuck together and brought in Jones to form a new group; their first gig was in September at the Coff-Inn, a youth centre in the basement of St. Theodore of Canterbury Anglican Church in nearby North York. They were paid CA$25. They had not named themselves at the time of the booking; Rutsey's brother Bill thought they needed a name that was short and to the point. He suggested Rush, and the group went with it. Due to increasing difficulties in getting to Lifeson's house for practice, Jones suggested that Lifeson get his schoolmate Gary "Geddy" Weinrib to step in on lead vocals and bass. Weinrib replaced Jones as Rush's frontman, adopting the stage name Geddy Lee. Rush rehearsed a set mainly formed of covers by various rock artists, including Cream, Jimi Hendrix, and John Mayall and underwent several line-up configurations that included Lindy Young on keyboards and various instruments, and Mitch Bossi on second guitar. Shortly after becoming a four-piece band of Lee, Lifeson, Young, and Rutsey, Ray Danniels was hired to be their manager. As Lee recounted years later, "Ray came along. He had no real reputation yet as a manager or anything. He was just kind of an agent working in Toronto. So he started directing the band and he just thought I wasn’t suitable, for whatever reasons he had. I don’t know whether it was the way I looked, or my religious background – who the f--- knew? Anyway, he influenced them and they went along with it, Alex Lifeson and John Rutsey, and I was out."

With Lee kicked out of the band, Rutsey recruited new bassist and vocalist Joe Perna. The group of Lifeson, Rutsey, and Perna named themselves Hadrian. After a disastrous gig with Perna, Rutsey invited Lee back and the group continued as Rush. Lee stated "I started a blues band and I was, frankly speaking, doing better than they were. Then I got a call from John and he said, 'Can we get together?' Basically, 'Can you come back? We're sorry.'" In March 1972, the band stabilized as a trio of Lifeson, Rutsey, and Lee. They kept Ray Danniels, a promoter of Rush's early shows, as their manager with his business partner and agent Vic Wilson sharing duties.

Rush honed their skills with regular gigs, initially touring the Ontario high school circuit. In 1971, the legal drinking age was decreased from 21 to 18, allowing the band to play bars and clubs. Lee said it was at this point that Rush turned "from a basement garage band that played the occasional high school gig to a regular working band playing six days a week." A demo tape was then shipped to various record labels, but Rush was unable to secure a deal, leading to the formation of their own label, Moon Records, with Danniels. Rush entered the studio in 1973 to record their first single; their cover of "Not Fade Away" by Buddy Holly was chosen as it had become a crowd favourite. "You Can't Fight It", an original song, was put on the B-side. Released in September, it went to No. 88 on the Canadian RPM Top Singles chart. In late 1973, Rush performed their first major gig, opening for the New York Dolls in Toronto, and finished putting down tracks for their first album. The initial sessions produced undesirable results over the sound quality, so tracks were recut and remixed with a new engineer, Terry Brown. Danniels sold his management company to help raise funds to make the record. Rutsey wrote the lyrics, but tore them up on the day Lee was to record them and would not produce a new set. Lee quickly wrote a fresh set based on earlier versions, which was used on the final takes.

The debut album, Rush, was released in March 1974; the initial pressing of 3,500 copies quickly sold out. It went on to peak at No. 86 on the RPM Top Albums chart. Most critics considered the album highly derivative of Led Zeppelin. It saw a limited release until it was picked up by Donna Halper, a music director and DJ at rock station WMMS in Cleveland, Ohio. She added "Working Man" to the station's regular playlist and the song's blue-collar theme resonated with hard rock fans in the predominantly working class city. In June 1974, Danniels signed Rush to the American booking agency ATI, of which executive Ira Blacker sent a copy of Rush to Mercury Records. The record caught the attention of A&R man Cliff Burnstein, who signed Rush with a $75,000 advance as part of a $200,000 deal.

Following a series of Canadian dates, Rutsey played his last gig with the band on July 25, 1974. His preference for more straightforward rock was incompatible with the more complex music that Lifeson and Lee had written, and Lee recalled Rutsey had a general distaste for life as a touring musician. His type 1 diabetes caused further complications, as he required frequent hospital visits to have tests and receive insulin. For several weeks prior to his departure Rutsey's health was too critical for him to perform, leaving Rush to continue with a substitute drummer, Jerry Fielding.

1974–1977: Arrival of definitive line-up and foray into progressive rock
After auditioning five drummers, Lifeson and Lee picked Neil Peart who joined on July 29, two weeks before the group's first US tour. They performed their first concert together on August 14 at the Civic Arena in Pittsburgh, opening for Uriah Heep and Manfred Mann's Earth Band to over 11,000 people. Peart assumed the role of lyricist; Lifeson and Lee had little interest in the job and recognised Peart's wider vocabulary range from reading regularly. Lifeson and Lee focused primarily on the music, with the new material displaying their influences from progressive rock bands Yes and Pink Floyd. When the US tour finished in December 1974, Rush had reached its peak of No. 105 on the US Billboard 200 chart.

Fly by Night (1975), Rush's first album with Peart, saw the inclusion of the story song "By-Tor & the Snow Dog", replete with complex arrangements and a multi-section format. Lyrical themes also underwent dramatic changes because of Peart's love for fantasy and science-fiction literature. Despite these new styles, some other songs on the album mirrored the simplistic blues style found on Rush's debut. "Fly by Night" was released as a single that reached No. 45 in Canada. The album reached No. 9 in Canada, where it was certified platinum by the Canadian Recording Industry Association (CAN) for selling 100,000 copies and in the US for selling one million copies there.

The band followed Fly by Night quickly with Caress of Steel (1975), a five-track album featuring two extended multi-chapter songs, "The Necromancer" and "The Fountain of Lamneth". Some critics said Caress of Steel was unfocused and an audacious move for the band because of the placement of two back-to-back protracted songs, as well as a heavier reliance on atmospherics and story-telling, a large deviation from Fly by Night. Intended to be the band's break-through album, Caress of Steel sold below expectations and the tour consisted of smaller venues and declining box office receipts, which led to the tour being nicknamed the Down the Tubes Tour.

In light of these events, Rush's record label tried to pressure the members into moulding their next album in a more commercially-friendly and accessible fashion; the band ignored the requests and developed their next album 2112 with a 20-minute title track divided into seven sections. Despite this, the album was the band's first taste of significant commercial success as it reached No. 5 in Canada, becoming their first to reach double platinum certification.

Rush toured 2112 between February 1976 and June 1977 with concerts in Canada, the US, and for the first time Europe, with dates in the UK, Sweden, Germany, and the Netherlands. The three sold-out shows at Massey Hall, Toronto in June 1976 were recorded for Rush's debut live album, All the World's a Stage. Released in September of that year, the double LP reached No. 6 in Canada and became Rush's first to crack the US top 40. Record World wrote: "Building its American reputation slowly but steadily Rush stands poised for breaking through all the way via this two record live set [...] All the highly charged electricity is here in an explosive setting." The liner notes includes the statement: "This album to us, signifies the end of the beginning, a milestone to mark the close of chapter one, in the annals of Rush."

1977–1981: Peak progressive era
After the conclusion of the 2112 tour, Rush went to Wales to record A Farewell to Kings (1977) and Hemispheres (1978) at Rockfield Studios. These albums saw the band members expanding the progressive elements in their music. "As our tastes got more obscure", Lee said in an interview, "we discovered more progressive rock-based bands like Yes, Van der Graaf Generator and King Crimson, and we were very inspired by those bands. They made us want to make our music more interesting and more complex and we tried to blend that with our own personalities to see what we could come up with that was indisputably us." Increased synthesizer use, lengthy songs, and highly dynamic playing featuring complex time signature changes became a staple of Rush's compositions. To achieve a broader, more progressive sound, Lifeson began to experiment with classical and twelve-string guitars, and Lee added bass-pedal synthesizers and Minimoog. Likewise, Peart's percussion became diversified in the form of triangles, glockenspiel, wood blocks, cowbells, timpani, gong, and chimes. Beyond instrument additions, the band kept in stride with the progressive rock trends by continuing to compose long, conceptual songs with science fiction and fantasy overtones. As the new decade approached, Rush gradually began to dispose of its older styles of music in favour of shorter and sometimes softer arrangements, due in part to the band's exhaustion from recording Hemispheres. The lyrics up to this point were heavily influenced by classical poetry, fantasy literature, science fiction, and the writings of novelist Ayn Rand, as exhibited most prominently by their 1975 song "Anthem" from Fly By Night and a specifically acknowledged derivation in 2112 (1976). The first single from A Farewell to Kings, "Closer to the Heart", was the band's first successful song in the UK, peaking at No. 36, while reaching No. 76 in the US and No. 45 in Canada. A Farewell to Kings did not sell as well as 2112, but still went platinum in both Canada and the United States By this time, Rush's record deal allowed them a CA$250,000 advance on each album and a 16% royalty rate.

Permanent Waves (1980) shifted Rush's style of music with the introduction of reggae and new wave elements. Although a hard rock style was still evident, more synthesizers were introduced. Because of the limited airplay Rush's previous extended-length songs received, Permanent Waves contained shorter, more radio-friendly songs, such as "The Spirit of Radio" and "Freewill", which helped the album become Rush's highest-charting album to date. "The Spirit of Radio" became the group's biggest hit single to date, peaking at No. 22 in Canada, No. 51 on the US Billboard Hot 100, and No. 13 on the UK Singles Chart. Peart's lyrics on Permanent Waves shifted toward an expository tone with subject matter that dwelled less on fantastical or allegorical story-telling and more heavily on topics that explored humanistic, social, and emotional elements. Rush toured Permanent Waves for six months through 1980 to over 650,000 people across 96 shows, becoming their first to make a profit. After the tour, Rush joined fellow Toronto-based rock band Max Webster to record "Battle Scar" for their 1980 release, Universal Juveniles. Their lyricist, Pye Dubois, offered the band the lyrics to a song he had written. The band accepted; the song went on, after reworking by Peart, to become "Tom Sawyer".

Rush's popularity reached its pinnacle with the release of Moving Pictures in early 1981. Moving Pictures essentially continued where Permanent Waves left off, extending the trend of accessible and commercially friendly progressive rock that helped thrust them into the spotlight. The lead track, "Tom Sawyer", is probably the band's best-known song. Upon release, it reached No. 24 on the Canadian Top 40 Singles Chart, No. 44 on the Billboard Hot 100, and No. 8 on the new US Album Rock Tracks chart. The second single "Limelight" also received a strong response from listeners and radio stations going to No. 18 in Canada, No. 54 on the Hot 100, and No. 4 on the US Album Rock Tracks Chart. Moving Pictures was Rush's last album to feature an extended song, the eleven-minute "The Camera Eye". The song also contained the band's heaviest usage of synthesizers yet, hinting Rush's music was shifting direction once more. Moving Pictures became the band's first album to reach No. 1 on the Canadian Albums Chart, and also reached No. 3 on the US Billboard 200 and UK album charts; it has been certified quintuple platinum by both the Recording Industry Association of America and Music Canada. Following the success of Moving Pictures, Rush released a second live recording, Exit... Stage Left, in 1981.

1981–1989: Synthesizer-oriented era

The band underwent another stylistic change with the recording of Signals in 1982. While Lee's synthesizers had been featured instruments ever since the late 1970s, keyboards were shifted from the background to the melodic front-lines in songs like "Countdown" and the lead-off track "Subdivisions". Both feature prominent lead synthesizer lines with minimalistic guitar chords and solos. Other previously unused instrument additions were seen in the song "Losing It", featuring collaborator Ben Mink on electric violin.

Signals also represented a drastic stylistic transformation apart from instrumental changes. The album contained Rush's biggest hit single, "New World Man", while other more experimental songs such as "Digital Man", "The Weapon", and "Chemistry" expanded the band's use of ska, reggae, and funk. The second single, "Subdivisions" reached No. 36 in Canada and No. 5 on the US Album Rock Tracks Chart. Both singles reached the Top 50 in the UK. Signals became the group's second No. 1 album in Canada, their third straight No. 3 album in the UK, and peaked at No. 10 in the US, while continuing their moderate success in the Netherlands, Sweden and Norway making the Top 30 in each country. Although the band members consciously decided to move in this overall direction, creative differences between the band and long-time producer Terry Brown began to emerge. The band felt dissatisfied with Brown's studio treatment of Signals, while Brown was becoming more uncomfortable with the increased use of synthesizers in the music. Ultimately, Rush and Brown parted ways in 1983, and the experimentation with new electronic instruments and varying musical styles would come into further play on their next studio album.

The style and production of Signals were augmented and taken to new heights on Grace Under Pressure (1984). It was Peart who named the album, as he borrowed the words of Ernest Hemingway to describe what the band had to go through after making the decision to leave Terry Brown. Producer Steve Lillywhite, who gained fame with successful productions of Simple Minds and U2, was enlisted to produce Grace Under Pressure. He backed out at the last moment, however, much to the ire of Lee, Lifeson and Peart. Lee said "Steve Lillywhite is really not a man of his word ... after agreeing to do our record, he got an offer from Simple Minds, changed his mind, blew us off ... so it put us in a horrible position." Rush eventually hired Peter Henderson to co-produce and engineer the album instead. Henderson was nominated for a Grammy Award for his work on Supertramp's Breakfast in America.

Musically, although Lee's use of sequencers and synthesizers remained the band's cornerstone, his focus on new technology was complemented by Peart's adaptation of Simmons electronic drums and percussion. Lifeson's contributions on the album were decidedly enhanced, in response to the minimalist role he played on Signals. Still, many of his trademark guitar textures remained intact in the form of open reggae chords and funk and new-wave rhythms. Grace Under Pressure reached the Top 5 in Canada and the UK plus the Top 10 in the US. It became the highest charter to that date in Sweden (No. 18), while becoming their first album to chart in Germany (No. 43) and Finland (No. 14). While "Distant Early Warning" was not a success on Top 40 radio, it peaked at No. 5 on the US Album Rock Tracks chart.

With new producer Peter Collins, the band released Power Windows (1985) and Hold Your Fire (1987). The music on these two albums gives far more emphasis and prominence to Lee's multi-layered synthesizer work, and he switched to an English-made Wal MK1 bass. While fans and critics took notice of Lifeson's diminished guitar work, his presence was still palpable. Lifeson, like many guitarists in the mid-to-late 1980s, experimented with processors that reduced his instrument to echoey chord bursts and thin leads. Power Windows went to No. 2 in Canada while peaking at No. 9 and 10 in the UK and US, respectively. The lead track, "The Big Money" made the Top 50 in Canada, the UK and US, plus No. 4 on the US Mainstream Rock Chart. Hold Your Fire represents both an extension of the guitar style found on Power Windows, and, according to Allmusic critic Eduardo Rivadavia, the culmination of this era of Rush. Hold Your Fire only went gold in the US whereas the previous five Rush albums had gone platinum, although it managed to peak at No. 13 on the Billboard 200. and made the Top 10 in Canada, the UK and Finland. Two tracks from Hold Your Fire, "Force Ten" and "Time Stand Still", both peaked at No. 3 on the US Mainstream Rock Tracks chart.

A third live album and video, A Show of Hands (1989), was also released by Anthem and Mercury following the Power Windows and Hold Your Fire tours, demonstrating the aspects of Rush in the '80s. A Show of Hands met with strong fan approval, but Rolling Stone critic Michael Azerrad dismissed it as "musical muscle" with 1.5 stars, claiming Rush fans viewed their favourite power trio as "the holy trinity". Nevertheless, A Show of Hands reached the gold album mark in the US and the platinum level in Canada. At this point, the group decided to change international record labels from Mercury to Atlantic. After Rush's departure in 1989, Mercury released a double platinum two-volume compilation of their Rush catalogue, Chronicles (1990).

1989–2000: Return to guitar-oriented sound and hiatus

Rush started to deviate from its 1980s style with the albums Presto and Roll the Bones. Produced by record engineer and musician Rupert Hine, these two albums saw Rush shedding much of its keyboard-saturated sound. Beginning with Presto (1989), the band opted for arrangements notably more guitar-centric than the previous two studio albums. Although synthesizers were still used, the instrument was no longer featured as the centrepiece of Rush's compositions. Continuing this trend, Roll the Bones (1991) extended the use of the standard three-instrument approach with even less focus on synthesizers than its predecessor. While musically these albums do not deviate significantly from a general pop-rock sound, Rush incorporated other musical styles such as funk and hip hop in "Roll the Bones" and jazz in the instrumental track "Where's My Thing?". "Show Don't Tell" from Presto was a No. 1 hit on the US Mainstream Rock Tracks Chart, and while the album reached the Top 10 in Canada, it was less successful in the US (No. 16) and the UK (No. 27). From Roll the Bones, "Dreamline (No. 1) and "Ghost of a Chance" (No. 2) were successful on US Mainstream Rock Radio stations marking a resurgence of Rush's album sales in the US (No. 3 and platinum), the UK (No. 10) and some other parts of northern Europe.

The transition from synthesizers to more guitar-oriented and organic instrumentation continued with Counterparts (1993) and its follow-up, Test for Echo (1996), both produced in collaboration with Peter Collins. Up to this point, Counterparts and Test for Echo were two of Rush's most guitar-driven albums. The latter album also includes elements of jazz- and swing-style drumming by Peart, that he had learned from drum coach Freddie Gruber during the interim between Counterparts and Test for Echo. "Stick It Out" from Counterparts reached the summit of the US Mainstream Rock Tracks Chart with the album peaking at No. 2 in the US and No. 6 in Canada. Test for Echo reached the Top 5 in both countries, with the title track again topping the US Mainstream Rock Tracks Chart. In October 1996, in support of Test For Echo, the band embarked on a North American tour, the band's first without an opening act and dubbed "An Evening with Rush". The tour was broken up into two segments spanning October through December 1996 and May through July 1997.

After the conclusion of the Test for Echo tour in 1997, the band entered a five-year hiatus primarily due to personal tragedies in Peart's life. Peart's daughter Selena died in a car crash in August 1997, followed by the death of his wife Jacqueline from cancer in June 1998. Peart took a hiatus to mourn and reflect, during which he travelled extensively throughout North America on his BMW motorcycle, covering . In his book, Ghost Rider: Travels on the Healing Road, Peart writes of how he had told his bandmates at Selena's funeral, "consider me retired." This left the band's future uncertain, and Lee and Lifeson prepared an archival album, Different Stages, for release during the hiatus. Mixed by producer Paul Northfield and engineered by Terry Brown, it is a three-disc live album featuring recorded performances from the band's Counterparts, Test For Echo, and A Farewell to Kings tours, dedicated to the memory of Selena and Jacqueline. After a time of grief and recovery, and while visiting long-time Rush photographer Andrew MacNaughtan in Los Angeles, Peart was introduced to his future wife, photographer Carrie Nuttall, whom he married on September 9, 2000. By the following year, Peart had decided to return to Rush.

2001–2009: Comeback, Vapor Trails and Snakes & Arrows

In January 2001, Lee, Lifeson, and Peart came together to see if they could reassemble the band. According to Peart, "We laid out no parameters, no goals, no limitations, only that we would take a relaxed, civilized approach to the project." With the help of producer Paul Northfield, the band produced seventy-four minutes of music for their new album Vapor Trails, which was written and recorded in Toronto. Vapor Trails marked the first Rush studio recording to not include any keyboards or synthesizers since Caress of Steel. According to the band, the album's developmental process was extremely taxing and took approximately 14 months to finish, the longest they had ever spent writing and recording a studio album. Vapor Trails was released on May 14, 2002; to herald the band's comeback, the single and lead track from the album, "One Little Victory", was designed to grab the attention of listeners with its rapid guitar and drum tempos. The album was supported by the band's first tour in six years, including first-ever concerts in Brazil and Mexico City, where they played to some of the largest crowds of their career. The largest was a capacity of 60,000 in São Paulo. Vapour Trails peaked at No. 3 in Canada and No. 6 in the US, while selling disappointingly in the UK where it peaked at No.38.

A live album and DVD, Rush in Rio, was released in October 2003 featuring the last performance of the band's Vapor Trails Tour on November 23, 2002, at Maracanã Stadium in Rio de Janeiro, Brazil. To celebrate the band's 30th anniversary, June 2004 saw the release of Feedback, an extended play recorded in suburban Toronto featuring eight covers of such artists as Cream, The Who and The Yardbirds, bands the members of Rush cite as inspiration around the time of their inception. To help support Feedback and continue celebrating their 30th anniversary as a band, Rush launched the 30th Anniversary Tour in the summer of 2004, playing dates in the United States, Canada, the United Kingdom, Germany, Italy, Sweden, the Czech Republic, and the Netherlands. On September 24, 2004, the concert at The Festhalle in Frankfurt, Germany was filmed for a DVD titled R30: 30th Anniversary World Tour, which was released on November 22, 2005. This release omitted eight songs also included on Rush in Rio; the complete concert was released on Blu-ray on December 8, 2009.

During promotional interviews for the R30 DVD, the band members revealed their intention to begin writing new material in early 2006. While in Toronto, Lifeson and Lee began the songwriting process in January 2006. During this time, Peart assumed his role of lyric writing while residing in Southern California. The following September, Rush chose to hire American producer Nick Raskulinecz to co-produce the album. The band officially entered Allaire Studios in Shokan, New York in November 2006 to record the bulk of the material. Taking the band five weeks, the sessions ended in December. On February 14, 2007, an announcement was made on the official Rush website that the title of the new album would be Snakes & Arrows. The first single, entitled "Far Cry", was released to North American radio stations on March 12, 2007, and reached No. 2 on the Mediabase Mainstream and Radio and Records Charts.

The Rush website, newly redesigned on March 12, 2007, to support the new album, also announced the band would embark on a tour to begin in the summer. Snakes & Arrows was released on May 1, 2007, in North America, where it debuted at No. 3 on the Billboard 200 with approximately 93,000 units sold in its first week. It also peaked at No. 3 in Canada and No. 13 in the UK, selling an estimated 611,000 copies worldwide. To coincide with the beginning of Atlantic Ocean hurricane season, "Spindrift" was released as the official second radio single on June 1, 2007, while "The Larger Bowl (A Pantoum)" saw single status on June 25, 2007. "The Larger Bowl" peaked within the top 20 of both the Billboard Mainstream Rock and Mediabase Mainstream charts, but "Spindrift" failed to appear on any commercial chart. The planned intercontinental tour in support of Snakes & Arrows began on June 13, 2007, in Atlanta, Georgia, coming to a close on October 29, 2007, at Hartwall Arena in Helsinki, Finland.

The 2008 portion of the Snakes & Arrows tour began on April 11, 2008, in San Juan, Puerto Rico, at José Miguel Agrelot Coliseum, and concluded on July 24, 2008, in Noblesville, Indiana at the Verizon Wireless Music Center. On April 15, 2008, the band released Snakes & Arrows Live, a double live album documenting the first leg of the tour, recorded at the Ahoy arena in Rotterdam, Netherlands on October 16 and 17, 2007. A DVD and Blu-ray recording of the same concerts was released on November 24, 2008. As Rush neared the conclusion of the Snakes & Arrows tour, they announced their first appearance on American television in over 30 years. They appeared on The Colbert Report on July 16, 2008, where they were interviewed by Stephen Colbert and performed "Tom Sawyer". Continuing to ride what film critic Manohla Dargis called a "pop cultural wave", the band appeared as themselves in the 2009 comedy film I Love You, Man, starring Paul Rudd and Jason Segel.

2009–2013: Time Machine Tour and Clockwork Angels
On February 16, 2009, Lifeson remarked that the band might begin working on a new album in the Fall of 2009 with American producer Nick Raskulinecz once again producing. In November 2009, Lee, Lifeson and Peart were awarded the International Achievement Award at the annual SOCAN Awards in Toronto. On March 19, 2010, the CBC posted a video interview with Lee and Lifeson where they discussed Rush's induction into the Canadian Songwriters Hall of Fame on March 28, 2010, at the Toronto Centre for the Arts' George Weston Recital Hall. The band was recognized for the songs "Limelight", "Closer to the Heart", "The Spirit of Radio", "Tom Sawyer" and "Subdivisions". In addition to discussing their induction, Lee and Lifeson touched on future material with Lee saying, "Just about a month and a half ago we had no songs. And now we've been writing and now we've got about 6 songs that we just love ..." On March 26, 2010, in an interview with The Globe and Mail, Lifeson remarked that there was even the potential for two supporting tours. Soon after, Peart confirmed Nick Raskulinecz had returned as co-producer.

In April 2010, Rush entered Blackbird Studios in Nashville, Tennessee with Raskulinecz to record "Caravan" and "BU2B", two new songs to be featured on the band's studio album Clockwork Angels. "Caravan" and "BU2B" were released together on June 1, 2010, and made available for digital download. The Time Machine Tour's first leg began on June 29 in Albuquerque, New Mexico, and finished on October 17 in Santiago, Chile, at the National Stadium. It featured the album Moving Pictures played in its entirety, as well as "Caravan" and "BU2B". It was suggested Rush would return to the studio after the completion of the Time Machine Tour with plans to release Clockwork Angels in 2011. However, Rush announced on November 19, 2010, that they would be extending the Time Machine Tour. The second leg began on March 30, 2011, in Fort Lauderdale, Florida, and came to an end on July 2, 2011, in Seattle, Washington. On November 8, 2011, the band released Time Machine 2011: Live in Cleveland, a concert DVD, Blu-ray and double CD documenting the April 15, 2011, concert at the Quicken Loans Arena in Cleveland, Ohio. After the tour's second leg was finished, Rush entered Revolution Recording studios in Toronto, Ontario to finalize the recording of Clockwork Angels. The second single, "Headlong Flight", was released on April 19, 2012. Peart and author Kevin J. Anderson collaborated on a novelization of Clockwork Angels that was released in September 2012.

Clockwork Angels was released in the United States and Canada on June 12, 2012, reaching No. 1 in Canada, No. 2 in the US, No. 21 in the UK and entering the Top 10 in most of Rush's traditional northern European markets. The supporting Clockwork Angels Tour began on September 7, 2012, with the performances on November 25, 2012, in Phoenix, Arizona and November 28, 2012, in Dallas, Texas recorded to make a live CD/DVD/Blu-ray that was released on November 19, 2013. During Rush's European leg of the Clockwork Angels Tour, the June 8, 2013, show at the Sweden Rock Festival was the group's first festival appearance in 30 years. On August 31, 2011, Rush switched their American distribution from Atlantic Records to the Warner Brothers majority-owned metal label, Roadrunner Records. Roadrunner handled American distribution of Time Machine 2011: Live in Cleveland and Clockwork Angels. Anthem/Universal Music would continue to release their music in Canada. On April 18, 2013, Rush was inducted into the Rock and Roll Hall of Fame.

2013–2020: R40 Tour, disbandment and Peart's death
On November 18, 2013, Lifeson said the band had committed to taking a year off, following the completion of the world tour in support of Clockwork Angels. "We've committed to taking about a year off", Lifeson said. "We all agreed when we finished this [Clockwork Angels] tour [in early August] we were going to take this time off and we weren't going to talk about band stuff or make any plans. We committed to a year, so that's going to take us through to the end of next summer, for sure. That's the minimum. We haven't stopped or quit. Right now we're just relaxing. We're taking it easy and just enjoying our current employment."

In September 2014, the Rush R40 box set was announced to commemorate the fortieth anniversary of the release of the band's self-titled debut album. It included five previously released live video albums, and various previously unreleased footage from across the band's career. On January 22, 2015, the band announced the Rush R40 Tour, celebrating the fortieth anniversary of Peart's membership in the band. The tour started on May 8 in Tulsa, Oklahoma, and wrapped up on August 1 in Los Angeles.

On April 29, 2015, Lifeson stated in an interview that R40 might be the final large-scale Rush tour due to his psoriatic arthritis and Peart's chronic tendinitis. He noted that it didn't necessarily mean an end to the band, suggesting the possibility of smaller tours and limited performances. He also said he would like to work on soundtracks with Lee. On December 7, 2015, Peart stated in an interview he was retiring. The following day, Lee insisted that Peart's remarks had been taken out of context, and suggested he was "simply taking a break". Lifeson confirmed in 2016 that the R40 tour was the band's last large-scale tour. The band's latest documentary, Time Stand Still, was announced in November 2016.

On January 16, 2018, Lifeson told The Globe and Mail that it was unlikely that Rush would play any more shows or record new material. He said, "We have no plans to tour or record anymore. We're basically done. After 41 years, we felt it was enough." In October 2018, Rolling Stone published an interview with Lee, who stated, "I'd say I can't really tell you much other than that there are zero plans to tour again. As I said earlier, we're very close and talk all the time, but we don't talk about work. We're friends, and we talk about life as friends. I can't really tell you more than that, I'm afraid. I would say there's no chance of seeing Rush on tour again as Alex, Geddy, Neil. But would you see one of us or two of us or three of us? That's possible."

On January 7, 2020, Peart died at the age of 67 following a 3½-year battle with glioblastoma, a type of brain cancer. A year later, Lee confirmed to Rolling Stone that Rush was "over" and expressed the impossibility of the band continuing without Peart: "That's finished, right? That's over. I still am very proud of what we did. I don't know what I will do again in music. And I'm sure Al doesn't, whether its together, apart, or whatever. But the music of Rush is always part of us. And I would never hesitate to play one of those songs in the right context. But at the same time, you have to give respect to what the three of us with Neil did together."

2021–present: Aftermath
In a January 2021 interview with Make Weird Music, Lifeson revealed that he and Lee were in talks of working together on new music: "We're both eager to get back together and kind of get back into that thing that we've done since we were 14 years old that we love to do. And we work really, really well together. So we'll see what happens with that." Lifeson reiterated the status of Rush and the possibility of continuing to work with Lee in a June 2021 interview with Eddie Trunk: "There's no way Rush will ever exist again because Neil's not here to be a part of it. And that's not to say that we can't do other things and we can't do things that benefit our communities and all of that. I have lots of plans for that sort of thing that don't necessarily include Geddy. I get asked this all the time — are we gonna do this, or are we gonna do that? Who knows? All I know is we still love each other and we're still very, very good friends, and we always will be."

In August 2022, Lee and Lifeson returned to the stage at the South Park 25th anniversary concert in Colorado, with South Parks co-creator Matt Stone on drums to perform "Closer to the Heart" alongside the members of Primus, their first performance since the death of Peart.

In September 2022, Lee and Lifeson performed at the London Taylor Hawkins tribute concert with Dave Grohl and Omar Hakim on drums. They performed "2112: Overture", "Working Man", and "YYZ", the latter of which was Hawkins' favourite Rush song. Later that month, Lee and Lifeson played the same set at the second Taylor Hawkins Tribute show in Los Angeles. Grohl once again drummed on "2112", Chad Smith of the Red Hot Chili Peppers joined them for "Working Man", and Danny Carey from Tool drummed for "YYZ".

Musical style and influences
Rush's musical style changed substantially over the years. Its debut album was strongly influenced by British blues-based hard rock: an amalgam of sounds and styles from such rock bands as Black Sabbath, the Who, Cream, and Led Zeppelin. Rush became increasingly influenced by bands of the British progressive rock movement of the mid-1970s, especially Pink Floyd, Genesis, Yes, and Jethro Tull. Whether Rush can actually be considered a progressive rock group is a controversial question among fans of the genre, but in the tradition of progressive rock, Rush wrote extended songs with irregular and shifting mood, timbre, and metre, combined with lyrics influenced by Ayn Rand. In the 1980s, Rush merged their sound with the trends of this period, experimenting with new wave, reggae, and pop rock. This period included the band's most extensive use of instruments such as synthesizers, sequencers, and electronic percussion. In the early 1990s, the band transformed their style once again to return to a more grounded hard rock style and simultaneously harmonize with the alternative rock movement.

Reputation and legacy

More than 40 years of activity has provided Rush with the opportunity for musical diversity across their discography. As with many bands known for experimentation, changes have inevitably resulted in dissent among critics and fans. The bulk of the band's music has always included synthetic instruments, and this has been a source of contention among fans and critics, especially the band's heavy usage of synthesizers and keyboards during the 1980s, particularly on albums Grace Under Pressure, Power Windows, and Hold Your Fire.

The members of Rush have noted people "either love Rush or hate Rush", resulting in strong detractors and an intensely loyal fan base. In 1979, The Rolling Stone Record Guide called them "the power boogie band for the 16 magazine graduating class". A July 2008 Rolling Stone article stated "Rush fans are the Trekkies/trekkers of rock". They have been cited as an influence by notable musical artists, such as Alice in Chains, Anthrax, Dream Theater, Fishbone, Foo Fighters, Iron Maiden, Jane's Addiction, Living Colour, Manic Street Preachers, Meshuggah, Metallica, No Doubt, the Pixies, Primus, Queensrÿche, Rage Against the Machine, Red Hot Chili Peppers, The Smashing Pumpkins, Elliott Smith, Soundgarden, and Tool. Trent Reznor of Nine Inch Nails has said that Rush is one of his favourite bands in the 2010 documentary Rush: Beyond the Lighted Stage, and has also cited the band's early 80's period in particular as a major influence on him in regards to incorporating keyboards and synthesizers into hard rock.

Rush was eligible for nomination into the Rock and Roll Hall of Fame beginning in 1998; the band was nominated for entry in 2012 and their induction was announced on December 11, 2012.  A reason for their previous exclusion may have been their genre. USA Today writer Edna Gunderson criticized the Hall of Fame for excluding some genres, including progressive rock. Supporters cited the band's accomplishments including longevity, proficiency, and influence, as well as commercial sales figures and RIAA certifications. In the years before induction, Lifeson expressed his indifference toward the perceived slight saying, "I couldn't care less. Look who's up for induction; it's a joke".

On April 24, 2010, the documentary Rush: Beyond the Lighted Stage, directed by Scot McFadyen and Sam Dunn, premiered at the Tribeca Film Festival. It went on to receive the Tribeca Film Festival Audience Award. The film was also nominated for Best Long Form Music Video at 53rd Grammy Awards, losing to When You're Strange, a documentary about The Doors. A limited theatrical run began on June 10, 2010, and the film was released on DVD and Blu-ray in the US and Canada on June 29, 2010. The film explores the band's influence on popular music and the reasons why that influence has been under-represented over the years. This is done via interviews with popular musicians, music industry professionals, and the band members themselves.

On June 25, 2010, Rush received a star on the Hollywood Walk of Fame at 6752 Hollywood Boulevard. Critical acclaim continued to mount for Rush in 2010 when, on September 28, Classic Rock announced Rush would be that year's Living Legends awarded at the Marshall Classic Rock Roll of Honour Awards in the UK. The award was presented on November 10, 2010. On September 29, Billboard.com announced Rush would also receive the 2010 Legends of Live award for significant and lasting contributions to live music and the art of performing live and reaching fans through the concert experience. The award was presented at the Billboard Live Music Awards on November 4, 2010.

In 2013, the Canadian government honoured Rush with a first class "permanent" postage stamp featuring the iconic "Starman" Rush logo. It is the equivalent of a "forever" stamp in the US.

The band members were made Officers of the Order of Canada in 1996. In May 2012, the band received the Governor General's Performing Arts Award for Lifetime Artistic Achievement at a ceremony at Rideau Hall followed by a gala at the National Arts Centre celebrating the award recipients the following day.  In 2017, the band members had three new microbe species named in their honour.

Geddy Lee

Geddy Lee's high-register vocal style has always been a signature of the band – and sometimes a focal point for criticism, especially during the early years of Rush's career when Lee's vocals were high-pitched, with a strong likeness to other singers like Robert Plant of Led Zeppelin. A review in The New York Times opined Lee's voice "suggests a munchkin giving a sermon". Although his voice has softened, it is often described as a "wail". His instrumental abilities, on the other hand, are rarely criticized. He has cited Jeff Berlin, Jack Casady, John Entwistle, Jack Bruce and Chris Squire as the bassists who had the biggest impact on his playing style. Lee's style, technique, and ability on the bass guitar have been influential to rock and heavy metal musicians, inspiring players including Steve Harris, John Myung, Les Claypool, and Cliff Burton. Lee is able to operate various pieces of instrumentation simultaneously during live concert, most evidently when Lee plays bass and keyboards, sings, and triggers foot pedals as in the song "Tom Sawyer".

Alex Lifeson

Lifeson as a guitarist is best known for his signature riffing, electronic effects and processing, unorthodox chord structures, and a copious arsenal of equipment used over the years.

During his adolescent years, he was influenced by Jimi Hendrix, Pete Townshend, Jeff Beck, Eric Clapton and Jimmy Page. Lifeson incorporated touches of Spanish and classical music into Rush's sound during the 1970s, reflecting his interest in progressive rock guitarists like Steve Hackett and Steve Howe.  To adapt to Lee's expanding use of synthesizers in the 1980s, Lifeson took inspiration from guitarists like Allan Holdsworth, Andy Summers of The Police and The Edge of U2, who gave him models for rethinking the guitar's role in Rush's music. Lifeson's guitar returned to the forefront in the 1990s, and especially on Vapor Trails (2002). During live performances, he was responsible for cuing various guitar effects, the use of bass-pedal synthesizers and backing vocals.

Neil Peart

Peart has been voted the greatest rock drummer by music fans, critics and fellow musicians, according to Drummerworld. He was also regarded as one of the finest practitioners of the in-concert drum solo. Initially inspired by Keith Moon, Peart absorbed the influence of other rock drummers from the 1960s and 1970s such as Ginger Baker, Carmine Appice, and John Bonham. Incorporation of unusual instruments (for rock drummers of the time) such as the glockenspiel and tubular bells, along with several standard kit elements, helped create a highly varied setup. Continually modified, Peart's drumkit offered an enormous array of percussion instruments for sonic diversity. For two decades Peart honed his technique; each new Rush album introduced an expanded percussive vocabulary. In the 1990s, he reinvented his style with the help of drum coach Freddie Gruber.

Peart also served as Rush's primary lyricist, attracting attention over the years for his eclectic style. During the band's early years, Peart's lyrics were largely fantasy/science fiction-focused, though after 1980 he focused more on social, emotional, and humanitarian issues. In 2007, he was placed second on Blender magazine's list of the "40 Worst Lyricists In Rock". In contrast, AllMusic has called Peart "one of rock's most accomplished lyricists", Gibson.com describes Rush's lyrics as "great", and others believe the lyrics are "brilliant".

Sales
Rush has released 24 gold records and 14 platinum records (including three multi-platinum), placing them fifth behind the Beatles, the Rolling Stones, Kiss and Aerosmith for the most consecutive gold or platinum studio albums by a rock band in the United States. As of 2005, Rush had sold about 25 million copies of their albums in the U.S. (ranked 88th among recording acts) and 40 million worldwide. As of April 2021, Moving Pictures was the band's highest-selling album at over 5 million units, having been certified 5× platinum by the RIAA.

Despite dropping out of the public eye for five years after the gold-selling Test for Echo (which peaked at No. 5 on the Billboard 200 chart) and the band being relegated almost solely to classic rock stations in the U.S., Vapor Trails reached No. 6 on the Billboard 200 in its first week of release in 2002 with 108,000 copies sold. It has sold about 343,000 units to date. The subsequent Vapor Trails tour grossed over $24 million and included the largest audience ever to see a headlining Rush show: 60,000 fans in São Paulo, Brazil.

Rush's triple-CD live album, Rush in Rio (2003), was certified gold, marking the fourth decade in which a Rush album had been released and certified at least gold. In 2004, Feedback cracked the top 20 on the Billboard 200 and received radio airplay. The band's 2007 album, Snakes & Arrows, debuted at No. 3 (just one position shy of Rush's highest-peaking albums, Counterparts (1993) and Clockwork Angels (2012), which both debuted at No. 2) on the Billboard 200, selling about 93,000 its first week of release. This marks the 13th studio album to appear in the Top 20 and the band's 27th album to appear on the chart. The album also debuted at No. 1 on the Billboard's Top Rock Albums chart, and, when the album was released on the MVI format a month later, peaked at No. 1 on the Top Internet Albums chart.

The tours in support of Snakes & Arrows in 2007 and 2008 accrued $21 million and $18.3 million, respectively, earning Rush the No. 6 and 8 spots among the summers' rock concerts.

Live performances
The members of Rush shared a strong work ethic, desiring to accurately recreate songs from their albums when playing live performances. To achieve this goal, beginning in the late 1980s, Rush included a capacious rack of digital samplers in their concert equipment to recreate the sounds of non-traditional instruments, accompaniments, vocal harmonies, and other sound "events" in real-time to match the sounds on the studio versions of the songs. In live performances, the band members shared duties throughout most songs. Each member had one or more MIDI controllers, which were loaded with different sounds for each song, and used available limbs to trigger the sounds while simultaneously playing their primary instrument(s). It was with this technology that the group was able to present their arrangements in a live setting with the level of complexity and fidelity fans had come to expect, and without the need to resort to the use of backing tracks or employing an additional band member. The band members' coordinated use of pedal keyboards and other electronic triggers to "play" sampled instruments and audio events was subtly visible in their live performances, especially so on R30: 30th Anniversary World Tour, their 2005 concert DVD.

A staple of Rush's concerts was a Neil Peart drum solo. Peart's drum solos included a basic framework of routines connected by sections of improvization, making each performance unique. Each successive tour saw the solo more advanced, with some routines dropped in favour of newer, more complex ones. Since the mid-1980s, Peart had used MIDI trigger pads to trigger sounds sampled from various pieces of acoustic percussion that would otherwise consume far too much stage area, such as a marimba, harp, temple blocks, triangles, glockenspiel, orchestra bells, tubular bells, and vibraslap as well as other, more esoteric percussion.

One prominent feature of Rush's concerts were props on stage, at one point called "diversions". These props have included washing machines, vintage popcorn poppers, or animations and inflatable rabbits emerging from giant hats behind the band. Starting in the mid-90s, the props often took up Lee's side of the stage (stage left) as a way to balance out the amp stacks on Lifeson's side (stage right) when Lee opted to use a venue's house system instead of amps.

Philanthropy
Rush actively participated in philanthropic causes. The band was one of several hometown favourites to play Molson Canadian Rocks for Toronto, also dubbed SARStock, at Downsview Park in Toronto on July 30, 2003, with an attendance of over half a million people. The concert was intended to benefit the Toronto economy after the SARS outbreaks earlier in the year. The band has also sustained an interest in promoting human rights. They donated $100,000 to the Canadian Museum for Human Rights after a concert they held in Winnipeg on May 24, 2008.

On July 24, 2013, Rush performed a benefit concert in Red Deer, Alberta, at the ENMAX Centrium with all proceeds going to the Canadian Red Cross to help victims of the 2013 flooding that devastated many regions of southern Alberta. The original venue for the show, the Scotiabank Saddledome, was heavily damaged from the flooding and was unavailable for the concert date as originally planned.

The individual members of Rush have also been a part of philanthropic causes. Hughes & Kettner zenTera and TriAmp electronics have been endorsed and used by Lifeson for many years. A custom signature amplifier was engineered by Lifeson and released in April 2005 with the stipulation UNICEF will receive a donation in the amount of $50 for every Alex Lifeson Signature TriAmp sold. Lee, a longtime fan of baseball, donated 200 baseballs signed by famous Negro league players, including Willie Mays, Hank Aaron, and Josh Gibson, to the Negro Leagues Baseball Museum in June 2008. In late 2009, Geddy Lee and Alex Lifeson launched an auction for their initiative "Grapes Under Pressure", in support of the cause "Grapes for Humanity". The auction consisted of items from the band such as signed guitars, cymbals and basses, as well as autographs on all items by the band members. There were also autographs by band members from Depeche Mode, Tool, the Fray, Judas Priest, Pearl Jam and more, as well as signatures from Ricky, Julian and Bubbles from Trailer Park Boys on a rare Epiphone guitar.

The band is featured on the album Songs for Tibet, appearing with other celebrities as an initiative to support Tibet and the current Dalai Lama Tenzin Gyatso. The album was made downloadable on August 5, 2008, via iTunes and was released commercially August 12, 2008.

Rush has also been a big supporter of Little Kids Rock, a national nonprofit that works to restore and revitalize music education programs in disadvantaged U.S. public schools. They teamed up with Musician's Friend and Sabian to help Little Kids Rock provide percussion to public schools nationwide. They donated $500 of the proceeds from every Neil Peart Paragon Cymbal Pack sold, each of which came with a free splash cymbal personalized, autographed, and dated by Peart. The cause-based marketing initiative raised over $50,000 for Little Kids Rock.

Band members

Definitive line-up
 Alex Lifeson – guitars, backing vocals, synthesizers, additional keyboards (1968–2018)
 Geddy Lee – lead and backing vocals, bass guitar, keyboards, synthesizers, guitar (1968–1969, 1969–2018), lyrics (1973–1974)
 Neil Peart – drums, percussion, lyrics (1974–2018; died 2020)

Early members
 John Rutsey – drums, percussion, backing vocals (1968–1974), lyrics (1968–1973; died 2008)
 Jeff Jones – bass guitar, lead vocals (August–September 1968)
 Lindy Young – keyboards, backing and lead vocals, guitars, percussion, harmonica (January–June 1969)
 Joe Perna – bass guitar, lead and backing vocals (May–July 1969)
 Bob Vopni – guitars, backing vocals (June–July 1969)
 Mitch Bossi – guitars, backing vocals (1971–1972)

Line-ups

Timeline

Discography

Studio albums

 Rush (1974)
 Fly by Night (1975)
 Caress of Steel (1975)
 2112 (1976)
 A Farewell to Kings (1977)
 Hemispheres (1978)
 Permanent Waves (1980)
 Moving Pictures (1981)
 Signals (1982)
 Grace Under Pressure (1984)
 Power Windows (1985)
 Hold Your Fire (1987)
 Presto (1989)
 Roll the Bones (1991)
 Counterparts (1993)
 Test for Echo (1996)
 Vapor Trails (2002)
 Snakes & Arrows (2007)
 Clockwork Angels (2012)

Concert tours
Sources: Rush.com and Rush: Wandering the Face of the Earth

 Rush Tour (1974–1975)
 Fly By Night Tour (1975)
 Caress of Steel Tour (1975–1976)
 2112 Tour (1976)
 All The World's A Stage Tour (1976–1977)
 A Farewell To Kings Tour (1977–1978)
 Archives Tour (1978)
 Hemispheres Tour (1978–1979)
 Permanent Waves Tour (1979–1980)
 Moving Pictures Tour (1980–1981)
 Exit Stage Left Tour (1981)
 Signals Tour (1982–1983)
 Grace Under Pressure Tour (1983–1984)
 Power Windows Tour (1985–1986)
 Hold Your Fire Tour (1987–1988)
 Presto Tour (1990)
 Roll the Bones Tour (1991–1992)
 Counterparts Tour (1994)
 Test for Echo Tour (1996–1997)
 Vapor Trails Tour (2002)
 R30: 30th Anniversary Tour (2004)
 Snakes & Arrows Tour (2007–2008)
 Time Machine Tour (2010–2011)
 Clockwork Angels Tour (2012–2013)
 R40 Live Tour (2015)

See also

 List of songs recorded by Rush
 List of Rush instrumentals

References

Sources

Further reading

Books

Analysis and appreciation
 Birzer, Bradley J. Cultural Repercussions: An In-Depth Examination of the Words, Ideas and Professional Life of Neil Peart, Man of Letters. Wordfire Press, 2015. .
 Bowman, Durrell and Berti, Jim. Rush and Philosophy: The Heart and Mind United. Open Court Press, 2011. .
 Bowman, Durrell. Experiencing Rush: A Listener's Companion. Rowman & Littlefield Publishers, 2014. .
 Freedman, Robert. Rush: Life, Liberty, and the Pursuit of Excellence. Algora Pub, 2014. .
 McDonald, Chris. Rush, Rock Music, and the Middle Class: Dreaming in Middletown. Indiana University Press, 2009. .
 Mobley, Max. Rush FAQ: All That's Left to Know About Rock's Greatest Power Trio. Backbeat Books, 2014. .
 Popoff, Martin. Rush: Album by Album. Voyageur Press, 2017. .
 Price, Carol S. and Robert M. Price. Mystic Rhythms: The Philosophical Vision of Rush. Wildside Press, 1999. .
 Roberto, Leonard. A Simple Kind Mirror: The Lyrical Vision of Rush. Iuniverse Star, 2000. .
 Telleria, Robert. Rush Tribute: Merely Players. Quarry Press, 2002. .

Biographies
 Banasiewicz, Bill. Rush: Visions: The Official Biography. Omnibus Press, 1988. .
 Collins, Jon. Rush: Chemistry : The Definitive Biography . Helter Skelter Publishing, 2006.  (hardcover).
 Gett, Steve. Rush: Success Under Pressure. Cherry Lane Books, 1984. .
 Harrigan, Brian. Rush. Omnibus Press, 1982. .
 Popoff, Martin. Rush: The Illustrated History. Voyageur Press, 2013. .
 Popoff, Martin. Anthem: Rush in the ’70s. ECW Press, 2020. .
 Popoff, Martin. Limelight: Rush in the ’80s. ECW Press, 2020. .
 Popoff, Martin. Driven: Rush in the ’90s and “In the End”. ECW Press, 2021. .

Memoirs
 Peart, Neil. Far and Wide: Bring that Horizon to Me! ECW Press, 2016. .
 Peart, Neil. Ghost Rider: Travels on the Healing Road. ECW Press, 2002.  (hardcover),  (paperback).
 Peart, Neil. The Masked Rider: Cycling in West Africa. Pottersfield Press, 1996. .
 Peart, Neil. Roadshow: Landscape With Drums – A Concert Tour By Motorcycle. Rounder Books, 2006. .
 Peart, Neil. Traveling Music: Playing Back the Soundtrack to My Life and Times. ECW Press, 2004. .
 Lee, Geddy. Geddy Lee's Big Beautiful Book of Bass. HarperCollins Publishers, 2018. .

Scholarly articles
 Barron, Lee. "Pulling Down Barriers: Neil Peart, Autobiographical Confession and Negotiated Rock Celebrity", Celebrity Studies, Vol. 7 No. 3, 2016, pp. 323–338.
 Bowman, Durrell S. "Let Them All Make Their Own Music: Individualism, Rush and the Progressive / Hard Rock Alloy", in Progressive Rock Reconsidered, Kevin Holm-Hudson (ed), Routledge, 2002.
 Connolly, T. "Mean, Mean Pride: Rush's Critique of American Cool", in T. Connolly and T. Iino (eds), Canadian Music and American Culture. Palgrave MacMillan, 2017.
 Friedman, Jonathan C. "Performing Grief: The Music of Three Children of Holocaust Survivors: Geddy Lee, Yehuda Poliker, and Mike Brant", Journal of Modern Jewish Studies, Vol. 16 No. 1, 2017, pp. 153–167.
 Horwitz, Steve. "Rand, Rush, and De-totalizing the Utopianism of Progressive Rock", Journal of Ayn Rand Studies, Vol. 5 No. 1, Fall 2003, pp. 161–172.
 McDonald, Chris. "Grand Designs: A Musical, Social and Ethnographic Study of Rush", PhD dissertation in ethnomusicology, York University, 2002.
 McDonald, Chris. "'Making Arrows Out of Pointed Words': Critical Reception, Taste Publics and Rush", Journal of American and Comparative Cultures, Volume 25 No. 3–4, September 2002, pp. 249–259.
 McDonald, Chris. "'Open Secrets': Individualism and Middle-Class Identity in the songs of Rush", Popular Music and Society Volume 31 No. 3, July 2008, pp. 313–328.
 Sciabarra, Chris. "Rush, Rand and Rock", Journal of Ayn Rand Studies, Vol. 4 No. 1, Fall 2002, pp. 161–185.
 Walsh, Brian. "Structure, Function and Process in the Early Song Cycles and Extended Songs of the Canadian Rock Group Rush", PhD dissertation in music theory, Ohio State University, 2002.

External links

 
 
 
 
 Article at thecanadianencyclopedia.ca
 Article at canadianbands.com
 

 
1968 establishments in Ontario
2018 disestablishments in Ontario
Anthem Records artists
Atlantic Records artists
Canadian culture
Canadian hard rock musical groups
Canadian heavy metal musical groups
Canadian Music Hall of Fame inductees
Canadian musical trios
Canadian progressive rock groups
Governor General's Performing Arts Award winners
Juno Award for Breakthrough Group of the Year winners
Juno Award for Group of the Year winners
Juno Award for Rock Album of the Year winners
Mercury Records artists
Musical groups established in 1968
Musical groups disestablished in 2018
Musical groups from Toronto
Roadrunner Records artists
Vertigo Records artists